The Johnson Yachts is a Taiwanese yacht manufacturer based in Kaohsiung, Taiwan.

History 
Johnson Yachts was founded in 1987 by John Huang, as of 2019 they have completed more than 350 yachts. Most Johnsons are operated by US owners in US waters.

Yachts 
The first Johnson 93 was released in 2018. It was designed in collaboration with Dixon Yacht Design.

The ninth Johnson 80 motor yacht was launched in 2019.

The first 110 Skylounge was launched in 2019.

In 2019, the shipyard presented the Johnson 115, designed by Dixon Yacht Design and Design Unlimited.

See also 
 List of companies of Taiwan
 Maritime industries of Taiwan
 Jade Yachts
 Horizon Yachts
 Ocean Alexander

References 

Yacht building companies
Taiwanese companies established in 1987
Manufacturing companies based in Kaohsiung
Taiwanese boat builders
Taiwanese brands